FrancisFrancis! is an espresso machine manufacturer owned by Illy. It was founded in 1994 by Francesco Illy. FrancisFrancis has produced espresso machines for the home market.

The most famous model is X1, designed in 1995 by award-winning Italian architect Luca Trazzi. Mr. Trazzi also designed some other models, including X7 and X8.

The Y1 developed in Italian studio, MM Design was awarded Red dot design award best of the best in 2011.

In 2004 the company was purchased by Illy, since then, FrancisFrancis! became the espresso machines of choice for Illy, always associated with the coffee brand. The Francis Francis! espresso makers were one of the first to feature the option for the E.S.E. pods.

In 2009 an X7 model was introduced which uses illy's iperespresso capsules. In 2011, this machine was upgraded to the X7.1.

Revisions 
The X2 had at least 3 revisions. The faceplate, the buttons and the dials change for each.

X2
 2 boilers, 2 steam nozzles (each boiler used for Coffee and steam) 
 2 analog thermometers + analog clock in the center of the faceplate
 2 Manual valves for steam
 6 switches: (Left On/Off, Left coffee group, Left Steam, Right On/Off, Right Coffee group, Right Steam) 
 4 lights: (Left on/off, Left temperature pilot, Right on/off, Right temperature pilot)
 Uses ESE Pods or ground coffee

X2.1 Evo:
 3 boilers (1 for each coffee group + 1 for steam)
 Only 2 analog thermometers on the face. (no clock)
 No manual valve for steam (activated by a switch)
 4 lights and 4 switches on the faceplate (On/Off, Coffee group 1, Coffee group 2, Steam)
 Uses Iperespresso professional capsules. (Optional ground coffee adaptor can be purchased)

X2.?
 3 boilers (1 for each coffee group + 1 for steam)
 3 analog thermometers on the face. (no clock)
 1 Manual valve for steam
 4 lights and 4 switches on the faceplate (On/Off, Coffee group 1, Coffee group 2, Steam)
 Uses Iperespresso professional capsules. (No optional ground coffee adaptor available)

Interesting facts
The red version of the X1 was inspired by the racing cars of Ferrari.
The new "ground" line of X1 (available in the UK) only support ground coffee and are not compatible with E.S.E. pods.
The X1 was used in an episode of Sex and the City involving Carrie Bradshaw getting a red X1 as a gift from Aleksandr Petrovsky.
The X1 appears on the kitchen counter of the main character's apartment in the sitcom 'Will and Grace'.
The X7.1 is now the largest selling FF line in the UK (as of April 2012)
According to Forbes magazine, the X1 is one of the best luxury espresso machines in the world.

See also 

 Bialetti
 Cimbali
 De'Longhi
 Elektra (espresso machines)
 Faema
 Gaggia
 La Marzocco
 Rancilio
 Saeco
 List of Italian companies

References

External links

Illycaffè
Espresso machines
Coffee appliance vendors
Coffee in Italy
Manufacturing companies established in 1994
Home appliance manufacturers of Italy
Italian brands
Italian  companies established in 1994